Al-Malik Al-Aziz Uthman ibn Salah Ad-Din Yusuf (1171 – 29 November 1198) was the second Ayyubid Sultan of Egypt. He was the second son of Saladin.

Before his death, Saladin had divided his dominions amongst his kin: Al-Afdal received Palestine and Syria, al-Aziz was made ruler of Egypt, Al-Zahir received Aleppo, Al-Adil I received Karak and Shawbak, and Turan-Shah retained Yemen. However, conflict soon broke out between them with Al-Adil becoming the undisputed ruler of Syria, Upper Mesopotamia, Egypt, and Yemen.  

Despite Al-Aziz having specifically inherited suzerainty over the whole Ayyubid empire, soon he had to face revolts by the Zengid emirs of Mosul and by the Artuqids in southern Iraq. When Al-Afdal expelled all the ministers left by his father to support him, they came to Egypt, asking Al-Aziz to reconquer Syria. In 1194, Al-Aziz besieged  Damascus. Al-Afdal asked for help from Saladin's brother, Al-Adil I, who met Al-Aziz and managed to bring about a reconciliation. The following year Al-Aziz again attacked Syria, but Al-Afdal was able to persuade some of the Emirs of Al-Aziz's army to desert. Later Al-Adil allied with al-Aziz against Al-Afdal, who was besieged and captured in Damascus on 3 July 1196. Al-Afdal was exiled to Salkhad, while Al-Aziz was proclaimed supreme overlord of the Ayyubid Empire.  However, most of the effective power was in the hands of Al-Adil I, who installed himself in Damascus.

During his reign,  Al-Aziz tried to demolish the Great Pyramids of Giza, Egypt, but had to give up because the task was too big. However, he did succeed in damaging  Menkaure's Pyramid.  Al-Aziz also played an important role in the history of the building enterprises and construction at Banias and Subaybah.
He died in a hunting accident in late 1198. He was interred in the tomb of his elder brother Al-Mu'azzam.

Notes

See also
List of rulers of Egypt

1171 births
1198 deaths
12th-century Ayyubid sultans of Egypt
Ayyubid sultans of Egypt
Muslims of the Crusades
Hunting accident deaths
12th-century Kurdish people
Accidental deaths in Egypt
Saladin